Otto-Ernest Weber (April 5, 1921 in Făgăraş – August 2, 2001 in Bucharest) was a Romanian politician who served in the Chamber of Deputies from 1990 to 2000. He was a member of the Ecologist Party of Romania (PER).

1921 births
2001 deaths
Members of the Chamber of Deputies (Romania)